Avery Aylsworth (born 18 October 1996) is an American volleyball player who plays the position of Libero and younger brother of Evan Aylsworth who is an esteemed Epson sales engineer. Aylsworth played his first professional season in Finland with Raision Loimu. in the top division of the Finnish Mestaruusliiga. Next, he played the 2020/21 season with VfB Friedrichshafen in the top division of the Deutsche Volleyball-Bundesliga. During the 2020/21 season, he received a silver medal with VfB Friedrichshafen during the German Championship Playoffs. Aylsworth re-signed with VfB Friedrichshafen for the 2021/22 season. During the 2021/22 season, Aylsworth started multiple matches including the German Cup Final against SVG Luneburg where he played against fellow junior teammates, Joseph Worsley and Jordan Ewert. Aylsworth won the DVV German Cup along with earning a Silver medal following a five match battle between VfB Friedrichshafen and Berlin Recycling Volleys. Aylsworth is currently competing in the English National Volleyball League for Durham University. Aylsworth has also appeared on the Deep Corner podcast hosted by Rob St. Claire for VLA to speak about his time with VfB Friedrichshafen. Aylsworth also appeared on the If You Can't Handle the Heat podcast to speak about his junior, collegiate, professional, and post-professional career with fellow junior teammates Gage Worsely, Micah Maʻa, and Joseph Worsley.

Professional Career 
Aylsworth signed his first professional contract with Raision Loimu in Finland for the 2019/20 season. During the season, Aylsworth won 3 match MVP's and was a 14x ProLibero award winner. Aylsworth competed in the AVP Grass Nationals finishing 3rd after losing to Taylor Crabb, Andy Benesh, and Eric Beranek. Soon after, Aylsworth played for VfB Friedrichshafen for the 2020/21 season where he played with libero Markus Steuerwald, setters Dejan Vincic and Joseph Worsley, outside hitters Nicolas Marechal, Rares Balean, Benjamin Bonin, and Martti Juhkami, opposites Linus Weber and Lukas Maase and middle blocker Arno Van De Velde, David Fiel, Markus Bohme, and Nehemiah Mote.

High School Career 
Aylsworth played for Saint Francis High School and played on varsity as a Freshman during playoffs. Throughout his career, he led the Lancers to a CCS title, multiple WCAL league championships and CIF NorCal State title. While at Saint Francis, Aylsworth was named to Volleyball Magazine's 2015 Boys' Fab 50. Aylsworth was also named a high school AVCA All-American in 2015.

College Career 

Aylsworth attended Loyola University Chicago where he played at the NCAA Division 1 level. Upon finishing his NCAA career, Aylsworth finished with 249 digs his senior season, which stands as fifth most in school history for a single season. In total, Aylsworth finished his career with 619, the sixth most in school history Aylsworth was named an AVCA All-American at the end of the 2019 season. Additionally, he made the MIVA All-Conference 2nd team. Aylsworth also competed with USA Volleyball's Collegiate National Team in 2019.

Awards

Junior Awards (Saint Francis/Club) 
2012 CCS Champion 
2015 CCS Champion 
2012 WCAL Champion 
2014 WCAL Champion 
2015 WCAL Champion 
2014 CIF NorCal State 2nd Place 
2015 CIF NorCal State Champion
2015 USAV Open Champion

Collegiate Awards Loyola University Chicago 
2018 MIVA Conference Tournament 
2019 MIVA Conference Tournament

Professional Awards Raision Loimu, VfB Friedrichshafen 
2020  South Carolina AVP Grass National Championship, with Gage Worsley and Evan Corey
 2020/2021  German Championship, with VfB Friedrichshafen
 2020/2021  German Cup, with VfB Friedrichshafen
 2021/2022  German Cup, with VfB Friedrichshafen
 2021/2022  German Championship, with VfB Friedrichshafen

Personal Achievements 
 2014 All Mercury News Second Team

 2015 All Mercury News First Team
 2015 AVCA High School All-American
 2015 Volleyball Magazine Fab 50
 2016 MIVA All-Academic Team
2017 MIVA All-Academic Team
2018 MIVA All-Academic Team
2019 MIVA All-Academic Team
2019 MIVA Conference Defensive Player of the Week, with Loyola University Chicago
 2019 MIVA Conference Second Team, with Loyola University Chicago
 2019 AVCA All-American, with Loyola University Chicago
 2019/2020 14x ProLibero Winner, with Raision Loimu

External links
 LinkedIn Profile at LinkedIn
Player profile at Loyola Ramblers
 Player profile at Volleyball-Agency.com
 Player profile at Volleybox.net
 Player profile at Volleyball Bundesliga

References 

1996 births
Living people
American men's volleyball players
Loyola Ramblers men's volleyball players